Goldthread may refer to:

 Gold thread, embroidery using metal threads
 The plant genus, Coptis
 The plant genus, Cuscuta